St Silas Church may refer to:
St Silas' Church, Blackburn
St Silas Church, Kentish Town
St Silas Church, Sheffield
St Silas' Church, Lozells